The 2017–18 Coupe de France preliminary rounds, Corsica make up the qualifying football competition to decide which teams from the French Corsica region take part in the main competition from the seventh round.

Second round 
The preliminary rounds in Corsica start with the second round due to the relatively low number of teams competing.

These matches were played on 27 August 2017.

Second round results: Corsica

Third round 
These matches were played on 9 and 10 September 2017.

Third round results: Corsica

Fourth round 
These matches were played on 23 and 24 September 2017.

Fourth round results: Corsica

Fifth round 
These matches were played on 7 and 8 October 2017.

Fifth round results: Corsica

Sixth round 
These matches were played on 21 and 22 October2017.

Sixth round results: Corsica

References 

2017–18 Coupe de France